Viranamur is a village in the southern state Tamil Nadu in India. It is located in Gingee Taluk, Villupuram District of Tamil Nadu.

References

Villages in Viluppuram district